Kathryn Janis Grody is an American actress and writer.

Early life and education

Grody was born in Los Angeles, California. She studied acting at HB Studio in New York City.

Career
Grody wrote, and acted in, the autobiographical play Mom's Life.

In 2013, Grody appeared as Lola in the Primary Stages production of The Model Apartment.

Personal life

She has been married to actor and singer Mandy Patinkin since 1980 and they have two children, Isaac and Gideon. In 2020, Gideon began filming and photographing Grody and Patinkin's daily lives, posting images and clips to multiple social media outlets. The couple soon developed a significant social media following. Later that year, Grody and Patinkin partnered with Swing Left, creating viral videos with their sons to encourage people to vote for Joe Biden in the 2020 United States presidential election.

Filmography (as actress)

References

External links

Actresses from Los Angeles
20th-century American dramatists and playwrights
American film actresses
American television actresses
Living people
Obie Award recipients
Patinkin family
20th-century American actresses
21st-century American actresses
Year of birth missing (living people)